Speed Queen is a laundry machine manufacturer headquartered in Ripon, Wisconsin, USA.  Speed Queen is a subsidiary of Alliance Laundry Systems LLC, which billed itself as the world's largest manufacturer of commercial laundry equipment as of 2004.

Products
Speed Queen makes a large variety of residential and commercial products, from -capacity tumblers to  washer-extractors, as well as dryers.  Its commercial machines are a popular brand for laundromats, apartment buildings, and hotels.

History
The company was founded in 1908 by Joe Barlow and John Seelig as Barlow & Seelig Manufacturing. They got their start by taking existing machine designs and improving them.  In 1922, Speed Queen was the first company to introduce washers with nickel-copper tubs.  The brand name "Speed Queen" was created in 1928. During World War II, it switched production to support the war effort, manufacturing 20 mm shells, and parts for airplanes, tanks and guns. Later, it was sold to McGraw-Edison Company (which also owned Eskimo fans and Toastmaster), and then to Raytheon. In 1998, Raytheon Commercial Laundry sold the brand to Alliance Laundry Systems.

Speed Queen Ireland 
Speed Queen Ireland provides cheap and easy self-service laundrettes around the Republic of Ireland

References

External links
 

Home appliance brands
Laundry businesses
Manufacturing companies based in Wisconsin
Ripon, Wisconsin
Manufacturing companies established in 1908
1908 establishments in Wisconsin
American companies established in 1908